Malden may refer to:

Places

United Kingdom
Old Malden, historically known as Malden, Kingston upon Thames, England
Malden Rushett, Kingston upon Thames, England
New Malden, Kingston upon Thames, England

United States
Malden, Illinois
Malden, Indiana
Malden, Massachusetts
Malden, Missouri
Malden, New York
Malden, Washington
Malden, West Virginia
Malden Hollow, a stream in the U.S. state of Missouri

Elsewhere
Malden, Netherlands
Malden Island, an uninhabited island in the central Pacific Ocean belonging to the Republic of Kiribati
Fort Malden, a history museum in Amherstburg, Ontario, Canada

People with the surname
Henry Elliot Malden (1849 –1931), known as H E Malden, Fellow and honorary secretary of the Royal Historical Society
Karl Malden (1912–2009), American actor
Richard Malden (1879–1951), English churchman and writer

See also

Maldon (disambiguation)
Morden (disambiguation)